Raymond Roberts may refer to:
 Jerry Roberts, British war-time codebreaker and businessman
 Raymond Roberts (Royal Navy chaplain), Welsh Anglican priest
 Raymond Roberts (politician), senator from Grenada
 Raymond Roberts, a pseudonym of the Canadian composer Ernest Seitz